The sharpnose darter (Percina oxyrhynchus) is a species of freshwater ray-finned fish, a darter from the subfamily Etheostomatinae, part of the family Percidae, which also contains the perches, ruffes and pikeperches. It is found in North America where it occurs in the southern tributaries of upper Ohio River, to the Kentucky River in Kentucky, south in the New River drainage to North Carolina. It prefers gravel runs and riffles of small to medium-sized rivers.

References

oxyrhynchus
Fish described in 1939
Taxa named by Carl Leavitt Hubbs
Taxa named by Edward Cowden Raney